Cambridge College is a private college based in Boston, Massachusetts. It also operates regional centers in Lawrence, Massachusetts, Springfield, Massachusetts, Guaynabo, Puerto Rico, and Rancho Cucamonga, California.

History

Founding
Cambridge College had its beginnings as an innovative graduate program created by Eileen Moran Brown and Joan Goldsmith in the newly created Institute of Open Education (IOE) in 1971 formed by John Bremer at Newton College of the Sacred Heart.  Students in education programs were given individual attention: for example, through critiques of videotaped student performance on the job. Within two years, Brown and Goldsmith were directing the IOE, and later affiliated the IOE with Antioch College, where Brown was named Dean. In 1979, Brown began the 18-month process of elevating the graduate program to an independent, fully accredited institution that was named Cambridge College.

1990s
A 2003 article in The Wall Street Journal reported that in 1996, the New England Association of Schools and Colleges had cited "quality control of academic achievement" as an "issue of overriding concern which is central to the academic credibility of the college" with reference to the graduate program in education.  The article discussed the lack of rigorous entrance requirements and grade inflation in the program as areas of concern.

2000s
John Bremer was invited to Cambridge College (2005–08) where he was appointed to the Elizabeth J. McCormack Chair in the Humanities.

In 2017, Cambridge College consolidated its four locations in Cambridge into a single campus in the Hood Office Park in Charlestown, a neighborhood of Boston.

In March 2020, Cambridge College acquired the New England College of Business and Finance, renaming it the New England Institute of Business at Cambridge College. In 2021, this branch of the College was rebranded as Cambridge College Global.

Academics
Cambridge College grants Bachelor of Science and Bachelor of Arts degrees. As of 2016, the undergraduate degrees in general business administration and management were the most popular majors at the college.

The School of Education offers graduate teacher and educational administrator preparation and licensure programs leading to Master of Education and Doctor of Education degrees and the Certificate of Advanced Graduate Study. The National Institute for Teaching Excellence in Cambridge combines a five-week summer program for adult students with an on-line or local-campus component and leads to a graduate degree in education.

The School of Management grants Master of Business Administration, Master of Management and the Master of Management in Health Care degrees. Students enrolling in the health care managerial competencies degree program must have 3–5 years of experience.

The School of Counseling and Psychology offers several different Master of Education in Counseling Psychology degrees.  Several of these degrees fulfill requirements for the educational portion of the licensure process in the states of Massachusetts and Connecticut.  A Certificate of Advanced Graduate Studies (CAGS) is also available in Counseling and Psychology.

Cambridge College Global offers fully online Associate of Science, Bachelor of Science, Bachelor of Arts, Master of Science, Master of Business Administration, and Doctor of Business Administration degrees in addition to various certificates.

The college is one of 1,900 "military-friendly" institutions belonging to the Servicemembers Opportunity Colleges (SOC) consortium.

Accreditation and authorization
Cambridge College is accredited by the New England Association of Schools and Colleges. It is also authorized to operate by the California Bureau for Private Post-Secondary and Vocational Education and the Council on Higher Education of Puerto Rico.

Notable alumni 
 Larry Garron (Class of 1985)
 Brad Hatfield, professor at Berklee College of Music

References

External links
 

Private universities and colleges in Massachusetts
Educational institutions established in 1971
Universities and colleges in Boston
1971 establishments in Massachusetts
Private universities and colleges in California